Xiphotheata moellendorfi is a species of beetle in the family Cerambycidae. It was described by Flach in 1890. It is known from Papua New Guinea and Indonesia.

Varietas
 Xiphotheata moellendorfii var. papuana Kriesche, 1924
 Xiphotheata moellendorfii var. laevicollis Aurivillius, 1924

References

Pteropliini
Beetles described in 1890